Chris Gale may refer to:

 Chris Gayle (born 1979), Jamaican cricketer
 Chris Gale (bowls) (born 1983), English lawn and indoor bowler